Rocky Point is an area in Tampa Bay consisting of both areas within and around the city limits of Tampa, Florida. It is connected to mainland Tampa by the Courtney Campbell Causeway, which continues west across the bay to Clearwater. Tampa International Airport is located at the other end of the causeway about a mile east of Rocky Point. The nearest neighborhoods are Dana Shores, Pelican Island, Sweetwater, and Baycrest Park. Additionally, Westshore is to the southeast, and the Town 'n' Country area is to the north.

The zip codes serving the area are 33607, 33615, and 33634.

Rocky Point is home to Rocky Point Golf Course, one of Florida's oldest golf courses; the world headquarters of Shriners International; several restaurants; luxury hotels; office buildings; and residential developments, including Dana Shores, Pelican Island, Sweetwater, Baycrest Park, Causeway Vista, and Spinnaker Cove.

References

External links
Area information from the city of Tampa
Rocky Point Golf Course

Neighborhoods in Tampa, Florida